KJWY may refer to:

 KJWY-LD, a low-power television station (channel 36, virtual 21) licensed to Salem, Oregon, United States
 WDPN-TV, a television station (channel 2) licensed to Wilmington, Delaware, United States, formerly licensed to Jackson, Wyoming, used the call sign KJWY from 1996 to 2013